Robust optimization is a field of mathematical optimization theory that deals with optimization problems in which a certain measure of robustness is sought against uncertainty that can be represented as deterministic variability in the value of the parameters of the problem itself and/or its solution.

History 
The origins of robust optimization date back to the establishment of modern decision theory in the 1950s and the use of worst case analysis and Wald's maximin model  as a tool for the treatment of severe uncertainty.  It became a discipline of its own in the 1970s with parallel developments in several scientific and technological fields. Over the years, it has been applied in statistics,  but also in operations research, electrical engineering, control theory, finance, portfolio management logistics, manufacturing engineering, chemical engineering,  medicine, and computer science. In engineering problems, these formulations often take the name of "Robust Design Optimization", RDO or "Reliability Based Design Optimization", RBDO.

Example 1

Consider the following linear programming problem

What makes this a 'robust optimization' problem is the  clause in the constraints.

If the parameter space  is finite (consisting of finitely many elements), then this robust optimization problem itself is a linear programming problem: for each  there is a linear constraint .

If  is not a finite set, then this problem is a linear semi-infinite programming problem, namely a linear programming problem with finitely many (2) decision variables and infinitely many constraints.

Classification 
There are a number of classification criteria for robust optimization problems/models. In particular, one can distinguish between problems dealing with local and global models of robustness; and between probabilistic and non-probabilistic models of robustness. Modern robust optimization deals primarily with non-probabilistic models of robustness that are worst case oriented and as such usually deploy Wald's maximin models.

Local robustness 

There are cases where robustness is sought against small perturbations in a nominal value of a parameter. A very popular model of local robustness is the radius of stability model:

 

The picture is this:

where the rectangle  represents the set of all the values  associated with decision .

Global robustness 

Consider the simple abstract robust optimization problem

 

where  denotes the set of all possible values of  under consideration.

The difficulty is that such a "global" constraint can be too demanding in that there is no  that satisfies this constraint. For instance, there could be an  that only slightly violates the robustness constraint but yields a very large payoff . In such cases it might be  necessary to relax a bit the robustness constraint and/or modify the statement of the problem.

Example 2
If there is no  such that , then the following intuitive measure of robustness suggests itself:

 

where  denotes an appropriate measure of the "size" of set . For example, if  is a finite set, then  could be defined as the cardinality of set .

An optimal decision is then a decision whose robustness is the largest.

This yields the following robust optimization problem:

 

This intuitive notion of global robustness is not used often in practice because the robust optimization problems that it induces are usually (not always) very difficult to solve.

Example 3
Consider the robust optimization problem

For instance, consider the relaxed robustness constraint
 

Thus, for  the relaxed robustness constraint reduces back to the original robustness constraint.
This yields the following (relaxed) robust optimization problem:

The function  is defined in such a manner that  

and 
 
 

It also satisfies the relaxed constraint
 

outside .

Non-probabilistic robust optimization models

The dominating paradigm in this area of robust optimization is Wald's maximin model, namely

 

where the  represents the decision maker,  the  represents Nature, namely uncertainty,  represents the decision space and  denotes the set of possible values of  associated with decision .  This is the classic format of the generic model, and is often referred to as minimax or maximin optimization problem. The non-probabilistic (deterministic) model has been and is being extensively used for robust optimization especially in the field of signal processing.

The equivalent mathematical programming (MP) of the classic format above is

Constraints can be incorporated explicitly in these models. The generic constrained classic format is

 

The equivalent constrained MP format is defined as:

Probabilistically robust optimization models
These models quantify the uncertainty in the "true" value of the parameter of interest by probability distribution functions. They have been traditionally classified as stochastic programming and stochastic optimization models. Recently, probabilistically robust optimization has gained popularity by the introduction of rigorous theories such as scenario optimization able to quantify the robustness level of solutions obtained by randomization. These methods are also relevant to data-driven optimization methods.

Robust counterpart
The solution method to many robust program involves creating a deterministic equivalent, called the robust counterpart. The practical difficulty of a robust program depends on if its robust counterpart is  computationally tractable.

See also 
 Stability radius
 Minimax
 Minimax estimator
 Minimax regret
 Robust statistics
 Robust decision making
 Stochastic programming
 Stochastic optimization
 Info-gap decision theory
 Taguchi methods

References

Further reading 
H.J. Greenberg. Mathematical Programming Glossary. World Wide Web, http://glossary.computing.society.informs.org/, 1996-2006. Edited by the INFORMS Computing Society.

Ben-Tal A., El Ghaoui, L. and  Nemirovski, A. (2006).  Mathematical Programming, Special issue on Robust Optimization, Volume 107(1-2).
Ben-Tal A., El Ghaoui, L. and  Nemirovski, A. (2009). Robust Optimization. Princeton Series in Applied Mathematics, Princeton University Press.

 Dodson, B., Hammett, P., and Klerx, R. (2014)  Probabilistic Design for Optimization and Robustness for Engineers John Wiley & Sons, Inc. 

Kouvelis P. and  Yu G. (1997). Robust Discrete Optimization and Its Applications, Kluwer.

Nejadseyfi, O., Geijselaers H.J.M, van den Boogaard A.H. (2018). "Robust optimization based on analytical evaluation of uncertainty propagation". Engineering Optimization 51 (9): 1581-1603. doi:10.1080/0305215X.2018.1536752.

Rustem B. and Howe M. (2002). Algorithms for Worst-case Design and Applications to Risk Management, Princeton University Press.

Wald, A.  (1950). Statistical Decision Functions, John Wiley, NY.

External links
 ROME: Robust Optimization Made Easy
 Robust Decision-Making Under Severe Uncertainty
 Robustimizer: Robust optimization software

Mathematical optimization